The 1904–05 Brown men's ice hockey season was the 8th season of play for the program.

Season
The downward spiral for Brown's ice hockey team continued as they again won no games against college teams. This season brought a new low as the Brunos lost every game they played and established two program worsts; the 15 goals Brown surrendered to Harvard are the most goals against in the history of the program and the 14-goal deficit is the worst goal differential the program has ever seen (as of 2019).

Roster

Standings

Schedule and Results

|-
!colspan=12 style=";" | Regular Season

References

Brown Bears men's ice hockey seasons
Brown
Brown
Brown
Brown